is a Japanese manga by Maya Miyazaki. It was adapted into an OVA.

Plot
Mizumura Shinta doesn't know what to make of the situation when the sexiest girl in school, Kishimoto Lilith, starts trying to seduce him and things get extremely physical. Shinta isn't rich or the popular guy in school, so it doesn't make sense why Lilith would be so interested in him. But Lilith is in fact a vampire, a Moroi, a secret she will kill to keep hidden, and she needs Shinta for a special purpose. As the relationship between Shinta and Lilith grows, it gets harder for her to keep the secret hidden. When violent unexpected attacks begin, those close to him, like his semi-romantic childhood friend Makimura Chizuru, are involuntarily thrown into the chaos, deep dark secrets get revealed...including a secret about Shinta himself he's not even aware of but everyone else seems to know.

OVA Cast

References

External links
 Official anime site 
 
 

2010 manga
2012 anime OVAs
Anime Works
Vampires in anime and manga
Seinen manga